Outnumbered is a British television sitcom starring Claire Skinner and Hugh Dennis. It was broadcast on BBC One from 28 August 2007 to 5 March 2014 for five series; four Christmas specials were screened between 2009 and 2016. A total of 35 episodes were produced.

The following is a list of Outnumbered episodes.

Series overview

Episodes

Series 1 (2007)
The first series was broadcast between 28 August and 5 September 2007.

Series 2 (2008)
The second series of Outnumbered began on 15 November 2008. New characters in the second series include Barbara (Lorraine Pilkington), the next door neighbour who is meant to be brilliant at raising her children and always highlights Sue's problems, and Jo, a female friend of Jake's, played by Michaela Brooks. Pete and Sue are suspicious that Jo may actually be Jake's girlfriend, although there is no evidence to suggest that Jake and Jo are more than friends. Angela appears less prominently in the second series than in the first, although she still appears in the first episode. Grandad becomes more of a regular, appearing in 5 episodes. Sue's demanding boss, unseen character Veronica, is replaced by another unseen character, Sue's charming new boss Tyson, who Pete is suspicious of. It is revealed in the final episode of Series 2 that he is a conman.

Christmas special (2009)

Series 3 (2010)
The third series started on 8 April 2010 at 9:30pm – 10:00pm on BBC One. Series 3 introduces Pete's mother Sandra, who has a gambling problem, in the first two episodes. Another new recurring character throughout the series is Kelly (Anna Skellern), a young woman who lives nearby on whom Jake has a crush. Auntie Angela also returns for one episode. Granddad, Barbara and Jo all fail to make reappearances, and the same can be said for recurring character Jane (who has previously appeared in one episode of each series and the Christmas special), however, she was mentioned obliquely in episode 2 when Jake says "Jane" is on the phone, and has to tell Pete "not annoying Jane" before he would take the call. This series averaged 4.99 million viewers. The series finale aired on 20 May 2010.

A recurring concept throughout the series is the family planning to move house, although this came to nothing, as in Series 4 they are still living in the same house.

No episode was broadcast on 29 April 2010 due to the Prime Ministerial Debate on BBC1.

Series 4 (2011)
The fourth series started on Friday 2 September 2011 at 9:00pm on BBC One. A Christmas Special has also been filmed.

Christmas special (2011)

Christmas special (2012)

Series 5 (2014)
A fifth series of the comedy was commissioned by the BBC on 27 June 2012, despite speculation the show was axed. The fifth series started filming on 22 September 2013, and began airing on BBC One from 29 January 2014. Tyger Drew-Honey and Daniel Roche commented it will be the final series, and was later confirmed by the BBC.

Boxing Day special (2016)

Comic, Sport Relief & Children in Need specials

References

External links
List of Outnumbered episodes at BBC Programmes
List of Outnumbered episodes at the British Comedy Guide

BBC-related lists
Lists of British sitcom episodes